Omar Sahnoun (18 August 1955 – 21 April 1980) was a French professional footballer who played as a midfielder.

Football career
Sahnoun was born in Guerrouma, Algeria the son of a harki, and his family settled in Beauvais, France in 1962. Ten years later, at only 17, he made his professional debuts with FC Nantes, under Jean Vincent. A talented offensive player, he appeared however intermittently for the club due to heart problems, only posting two productive seasons in seven years, especially 1976–77 where he scored 15 times in 32 matches, as the Pays de la Loire team won the fourth Ligue 1 title in their history.

Sahnoun gained six caps for France, his debut coming on 23 February 1977 in a friendly with West Germany, in Paris. At the end of the year, he suffered a cardiac alert which cause him to put his career on hold for a few months; subsequently, he would not make the list for the 1978 FIFA World Cup in Argentina.

After having returned to active, Sahnoun played one year for FC Girondins de Bordeaux, being regularly used in a team that finished in sixth position. On 21 April 1980, four months shy of his 25th birthday, during club training, he died from a heart attack.

Personal life
Sahnoun's son, Nicolas, was also a footballer and a midfielder. He too played for Bordeaux.

Honours
Ligue 1: 1972–73, 1976–77
Coupe de France: 1978–79

References

External links
 

Biography at We Are Football 

1955 births
1980 deaths
People from Bouïra Province
Algerian emigrants to France
French footballers
Association football midfielders
Ligue 1 players
AS Beauvais Oise players
FC Nantes players
FC Girondins de Bordeaux players
France international footballers
Mediterranean Games silver medalists for France
Mediterranean Games medalists in football
Competitors at the 1975 Mediterranean Games
Association football players who died while playing
Sport deaths in France